Franić is a surname. Notable people with the surname include:

 Borna Franić (born 1975), Croatian handball player
 Darko Franić (born 1987), Croatian footballer
 Domagoj Franić (born 1993), Croatian footballer
 Frane Franić (1912–2007), Croatian Roman Catholic archbishop

See also
 Frane

Croatian surnames